Bjelland Church is a parish church of the Church of Norway in Lindesnes Municipality in Agder county, Norway. It is located in the village of Bjelland. It is one of the churches for the Marnardal parish which is part of the Lister og Mandal prosti (deanery) in the Diocese of Agder og Telemark. The white, wooden church was built in a cruciform design in 1793 using plans drawn up by an unknown architect. The church seats about 300 people.

History
The earliest existing historical records of the church date back to the year 1413, but it was not new that year. The first church on the site was possibly a stave church and it was torn down around the year 1636 and it was replaced with a new building. In 1793, the church building was described as "so rotten and dilapidated that it is next to useless". That year, it was torn down and replaced with a new, timber-framed cruciform building.

In 1814, this church served as an election church. Together with more than 300 other parish churches across Norway, it was a polling station for elections to the 1814 Norwegian Constituent Assembly which wrote the Constitution of Norway. This was Norway's first national elections. Each church parish was a constituency that elected people called "electors" who later met together in each county to elect the representatives for the assembly that was to meet in Eidsvoll later that year.

See also
List of churches in Agder og Telemark

References

Lindesnes
Churches in Agder
Wooden churches in Norway
Cruciform churches in Norway
18th-century Church of Norway church buildings
Churches completed in 1793
14th-century establishments in Norway
Norwegian election church